Prairie smoke is a common name for several plants and may refer to:
Geum triflorum (also called Three-Flowered Avens, Old Man's Whiskers), a spring perennial prairie wild flower
Pulsatilla nuttalliana (also called Anemone patens), in the buttercup family Ranunculaceae